The Washington Center for Internships and Academic Seminars, less formally known as The Washington Center, is an independent, nonprofit organization serving hundreds of universities in the United States and other countries. The Washington Center provides selected college students challenging opportunities to work and learn in Washington D.C. for academic credit. The Washington Center has over 50,000 alumni, many of whom are in leadership positions in the public, private, and nonprofit sectors. Its headquarters is located within the Sixteenth Street Historic District.

References

External links
Official website

C-SPAN Q&A interview with students from The Washington Center, January 24, 2010
C-SPAN Q&A interview with students from The Washington Center, January 16, 2011

Internship programs
Non-profit organizations based in Washington, D.C.
Organizations established in 1975
1975 establishments in Washington, D.C.